Archibald Carey or Cary may refer to:

 Archibald Carey Jr. (1908–1981), African-American politician
 Archibald Cary (1721–1787), colonial-era Virginia politician

See also
 Archibald Cary Coolidge (1866–1928), American educator